Itrat Husain Zuberi  (8 June 1920 – 14 December 1964) was a noted educationist of Pakistan. He started his educational career as a teacher in East Pakistan. He served in various capacities such as professor, Principal, Vice Chancellor, Education Advisor and Member, Executive Board of UNESCO till his retirement. Dr Itrat was the first Indian to have the distinction of being elected a Carnegie Fellow at Oxford.

Education
Zuberi was M.A., Ph D, D.F. R.S.I. He was educated at St. John's College, Agra, where he took his MA; Allahabad University; Merton College, Oxford (1948-1950); and the University of Edinburgh where he worked under the renowned professor, Sir Herbert JC Grierson.

Professor and Principal Islamia College, Calcutta (1938–1953)
Zuberi joined the Bengal Senior Education Service in 1938 as senior professor of English at Islamia College, an undergraduate college of the prestigious University of Calcutta before the establishment of the University of Rajshahi. Zuberi served Islamia College as a senior professor and Principal until he became Vice-Chancellor of the University of Rajshahi in 1953.

In 1942 Zuberi married Saida Idris; they had one son and two daughters.

Vice Chancellor, Rajshahi University, Rajshahi (1953–1957)
In 1953, the Government of East Pakistan (now Bangladesh) adopted the Rajshahi University Act 1953, which was published through a gazette notification on 16 June 1953. The Governor of East Bengal was the Chancellor, and Zuberi, the Principal of Islamia college, was appointed the first Vice-Chancellor of the university. Dr Itrat worked together with another patron of learning, Mr. Madar Baksh and prepared a plan for the full-fledged university. All intermediate and degree colleges and also the colleges of vocational and technical education of Rajshahi and Khulna divisions were affiliated to the newly established university. Dr Itrat served the Rajshai University as Vice-Chancellor from  7 June 1953 till 30 September 1957.

Educational Adviser, Ministry of Education, Pakistan
After the creation of India and Pakistan in 1947, Zuberi continued to serve East Pakistan until 1957, when he became Educational Adviser at the Ministry of Education in Karachi.

Member, Executive Board of UNESCO
On 19 December 1957 Zuberi was appointed as a member of the Executive Board of UNESCO, during its 49th session held in Paris. The Executive Board adopted the agenda (Item 2) whereby the resignation of Dr Momtazuddin Ahmed (Pakistan) was accepted under paragraph 4 of Article V of UNESCO's Constitution, and appointed Zuberi, Educational Adviser, Ministry of Education Karachi to replace him until the end of his term of office.

Zuberi (or Juberi) belongs to Kamboh lineage.

Zuberi died in Canada, where he was Professor of English literature at the University of Windsor, on 14 December 1964; he was buried in Karachi seven days later.

Publications

 The Dogmatic and Mystical Theology of John Donne (1938, London: Society for Promoting Christian Knowledge & New York: Macmillan)
 The Technique of T. S. Eliot and the "Portrait of a Lady" (1945, London & New York: Longmans-Green)
 The Mystical Element in the Metaphysical Poets of the Seventeenth Century (1948, Edinburgh: Oliver and Boyd)
 From Mallory to Huxley (1951)
 English Prose, 1600-1660 (1965, New York: Holt, Rinehart and Winston) (with: Victor Harris)
 Poems (1974, Pakistan: s.n.)

See also
 Zubairi

References

External links 
 Tarikh-i-Qaum Kamboh, 1996, Chaudhry Muhammad Yusuf Hasan

Pakistani educational theorists
1964 deaths
Academic staff of the University of Calcutta
Vice-Chancellors of the University of Rajshahi
Alumni of Merton College, Oxford
1920 births
Indian expatriates in the United Kingdom